Ossonis clytomima is a species of beetle in the family Cerambycidae. It was described by Francis Polkinghorne Pascoe in 1867. It is known from Malaysia and Borneo. It contains the varietas Ossonis clytomima var. flavotibialis.

References

Saperdini
Beetles described in 1867